Abu'l-Musafir al-Fath (died 929) was the last Sajid amir of Azerbaijan (928–929). He was the son of Muhammad al-Afshin.

In 928 Abu'l-Musafir was invested with the government of Azerbaijan by the caliph after Abu'l-Musafir's uncle Yusuf Ibn Abi'l-Saj was killed. After only one and a half years of rule, however, he was poisoned in Ardabil by one of his slaves. The Sajid dynasty came to an end with his death; he was succeeded as governor by Wasif al-Shirvani.

References
 

929 deaths
Sajid rulers
10th-century rulers in Asia
Year of birth unknown
10th-century Iranian people
Deaths by poisoning